Streptomyces graminearus is a bacterium species from the genus of Streptomyces. Streptomyces graminearus produces the antibiotic gougerotin.

See also 
 List of Streptomyces species

References

Further reading

External links
Type strain of Streptomyces graminearus at BacDive -  the Bacterial Diversity Metadatabase

graminearus
Bacteria described in 1986